Amy Cozad Magaña (born 6 May 1991) is an American diver. She competed in the synchronized women's 10 metre platform at the 2016 Summer Olympics, where she and Jessica Parratto finished 7th out of 8 teams.

Cozad participated in college diving at Indiana University.

References

External links
 

1991 births
Living people
Divers at the 2016 Summer Olympics
American female divers
Olympic divers of the United States
Sportspeople from Indianapolis
Indiana Hoosiers women's divers
Pan American Games medalists in diving
Pan American Games bronze medalists for the United States
Divers at the 2019 Pan American Games
Medalists at the 2019 Pan American Games